Telltale or tell-tale may refer to:

Advisory devices in vehicles:
 Tell-tale (spacecraft), a status indicator in a spacecraft control system
 Tell-tale (sailing), a piece of fabric attached as a guide for adjusting a sail
 Tell-tale (bridges), cords or chains suspended from bridges to warn vehicle drivers of low clearance
 Tell-tale (automotive), a light to signal a problem in a vehicle
 Yaw string, or telltale, a short string to indicate aircraft movement
 A hole in the firebox of a steam engine to warn of corrosion
 A safety device on a British Railways Mark 1 railway carriage linking the communication cord with the railway line

Other:
 Telltale (TV series), a 1993 ITV miniseries, starring Bernard Hill and Nigel Harrison
 Tell-Tale (film), a 2009 film based on "The Tell-Tale Heart" by Edgar Allan Poe
 Telltale Games, a video game developer
 Telltale (Rainbow), a group of musicians known for their work on the 1970s British TV series Rainbow